WSHL may refer to:

 Western States Hockey League, a junior ice hockey league in the United States.
 WSHL-FM, a student run radio station (91.3 FM) at Stonehill College in Easton, Massachusetts.